Heydarabad in Selseleh County, may refer to:

 Heydarabad, Honam
 Heydarabad, Qaleh-ye Mozaffari
 Heydarabad-e Chenareh